Elan is a rural locality (a selo) in Bichursky District, Republic of Buryatia, Russia. The population was 1,082 as of 2010. There are 9 streets.

Geography 
Elan is located 28 km southwest of Bichura (the district's administrative centre) by road. Khayan is the nearest rural locality.

References 

Rural localities in Bichursky District